Campbell Farm, also known as Hite Farm, is a historic home and farm located near Edinburg, Shenandoah County, Virginia.  The house was built in 1888–1889, and is a -story, three bay, Queen Anne style frame dwelling.  It features corner turrets, a hipped roof with patterned slate shingles, and a front porch with a sawnwork balustrade. The property includes a number of contributing outbuildings including a wash house / kitchen, two-room privy, a barn, a machine shed, and a corn crib.

It was listed on the National Register of Historic Places in 1990.

References

Houses on the National Register of Historic Places in Virginia
Farms on the National Register of Historic Places in Virginia
Queen Anne architecture in Virginia
Houses completed in 1889
Houses in Shenandoah County, Virginia
National Register of Historic Places in Shenandoah County, Virginia